The following article presents a summary of the 1953 football (soccer) season in Brazil, which was the 52nd season of competitive football in the country.

Torneio Rio-São Paulo

Final Standings

Corinthians declared as the Torneio Rio-São Paulo champions.

State championship champions

(1)ASA and Ferroviário-AL shared the 1953 Campeonato Alagoano title.

(2)In 1953, two competitions were contested in Rio de Janeiro. The first one was a regular state championship, played only by Vale do Paraíba teams and the second one was named Supercampeonato (Superchampionship), which was an extra tournament played by the champions of Niterói, Campos dos Goytacazes and Vale do Paraíba local competitions.

Brazilian clubs in international competitions

Brazil national team
The following table lists all the games played by the Brazil national football team in official competitions and friendly matches during 1953.

References

 Brazilian competitions at RSSSF
 1953 Brazil national team matches at RSSSF

 
Seasons in Brazilian football
Brazil